Hofpfisterei is a chain of bakery shops, headquartered in Munich, Bavaria, Germany. Its business focusses on southern Germany. It has 163 branches and employs about 950 people.

Its history reaches back to the year 1331 when the mill Toratsmühle was mentioned for the first time. It must have existed before that date. The products are also sold online, for example to Austria, France, Sweden and Switzerland.

From 1978 the bread contains no additives and the flours are examined for residues in their own laboratory. However, examinations by foodwatch in 2008 showed that some additives had been used and Hofpfisterei has since made some changes.

See also 
List of oldest companies

References

External links 
Homepage in German
Facebook page

Bakeries of Germany
Food and drink companies based in Munich
Manufacturing companies based in Munich
Companies established in the 14th century
14th-century establishments in the Holy Roman Empire